Joseph Marcelin Wilfred Bourgeois (February 20, 1901 – November 25, 1977) was a Canadian politician. He served in the Legislative Assembly of New Brunswick as member of the Progressive Conservative party from 1952 to 1960. Bourgeois died a hospital in Moncton in 1977.

References

1901 births
1977 deaths
People from Moncton
Progressive Conservative Party of New Brunswick MLAs